The Bishop of Lahore may refer to:

 the United Protestant Bishop of Lahore
 the former Anglican Bishop of Lahore
 the Roman Catholic Bishop of Lahore, in use from 1886 until 1994 when the diocese was elevated to an archdiocese